The 2018–19 Slavic Cup was a season of the FIS Cross-Country Slavic Cup, a Continental Cup season in cross-country skiing for men and women. The season began on 15 December 2018 in Štrbské Pleso, Slovakia and concluded on 27 February 2019 in Kremnica, Slovakia.

Calendar

Men

Women

Overall standings

Men's overall standings

Women's overall standings

References

External links
Men's Overall standings (FIS)
Women's Overall standings (FIS)

Slavic Cup
FIS Cross-Country Slavic Cup seasons
2018 in cross-country skiing
2019 in cross-country skiing